{{DISPLAYTITLE:Zeta2 Muscae}}

Zeta2 Muscae, Latinized from ζ2 Muscae, is a star in the southern constellation of Musca. Its apparent magnitude is 5.16. This is a white main sequence star of spectral type A5V around 330 light-years distant from Earth. Like several other stars in the constellation, it is a member of the Lower Centaurus–Crux subgroup of the Scorpius–Centaurus association, a group of predominantly hot blue-white stars that share a common origin and proper motion across the galaxy. It is part of a triple star system with faint companions at 0.5 and 32.4 arc seconds distance. The former is an infrared source, the latter has a visual magnitude of 10.7.

References

Lower Centaurus Crux
Musca (constellation)
Muscae, Zeta2
4703
060320
107566
BD-66 1747
A-type main-sequence stars